Niridazole is a schistosomicide. It is used to treat schistosomiasis, the helmintic disease caused by certain flatworms (trematodes) from the genus Schistosoma (formerly Bilharzia). It is also known by its trade name Ambilhar. It is usually given as tablets.

Niridazole has central nervous system toxicity and can cause dangerous side effects, such as hallucinations. Also, it may cause allergic reactions in sensitive people. However, it is one of the most effective schistosomicide drugs.

It has recently also been investigated for use in the treatment of periodontitis.


Mechanism of action 
Niridazole is rapidly concentrated in the parasite and inhibits oogenesis and spermatogenesis. The compound also inhibits the phosphofructokinase enzyme, leading to glycogen depletion and hepatic shift.

References 

Antiparasitic agents
IARC Group 2B carcinogens
Imidazolidinones
Nitrothiazoles